The men's 10,000 metres at the 2013 Asian Athletics Championships was held at the Shree Shiv Chhatrapati Sports Complex on 4 July.

Results

References
Results

10000
10,000 metres at the Asian Athletics Championships